Oreonectes translucens is a species of cyprinid of the genus Oreonectes. It inhabits the Xia'ao Cave in Guangxi Zhuang Autonomous Region, China. Described in 2006, it is considered harmless to humans. It has 11 dorsal soft rays, 9 anal soft rays and 36 vertebrae. It has not been classified on the IUCN Red List.

References

Cyprinid fish of Asia
Freshwater fish of China
Fish described in 2006